Oh Hee-joon is a South Korean actor. He is known for his roles in dramas such as Gangnam Beauty, How to Buy a Friend, 365: Repeat the Year, Cheese in the Trap and All of Us Are Dead. He also appeared in movies The Accidental Detective 2: In Action, The Gangster, the Cop, the Devil, Vanishing Time: A Boy Who Returned and My Brilliant Life.

Filmography

Television series

Film

Awards and nominations

References

External links 
 
 

1988 births
Living people
People from Cheongju
21st-century South Korean male actors
South Korean male television actors
South Korean male film actors